The 1935 NCAA Track and Field Championships was the 14th NCAA track and field championship.  The event was held at Edwards Stadium in Berkeley, California in June 1935.  The University of Southern California won the team championship with  points.

Ohio State's Jesse Owens won championships in four individual events—the 100-yard sprint, the 220-yard sprint, the 220-yard low hurdles, and the broad jump (now called the long jump).  Owens accounted for 40 of Ohio State's  points in the team scoring, with pole vaulter John Wonsowicz contributing the remaining one-fifth of a point.

Team scoring
1. Southern California -  points
2. Ohio State -  points
3. California - 20 points
3. Stanford - 20 points
5. Fresno State - 16 points
5. Pittsburg State Teachers (Kansas) - 16 points
7. LSU - 14 points
7. Michigan - 14 points
7. Notre Dame - 14 points
10. Northwestern - 12 points
10. Purdue - 12 points
10. Temple - 12 points
10. Washington State - 12 points

Track events
100-yard dash  
1. Jesse Owens, Ohio State - 9.8 seconds
2. Eulace Peacock, Temple
3. George Anderson, California

120-yard high hurdles
1. Sam Allen, Oklahoma Baptist - 14.5 seconds
2. Sam Klopstock, Stanford
3. Phil Cope, USC

220-yard dash 
1. Jesse Owens, Ohio State - 21.5 seconds
2. George Anderson, California
3. Herman Neugass, Tulane

220-yard low hurdles 
1. Jesse Owens, Ohio State - 23.4 seconds
2. Glenn Hardin, LSU
3. Bill Wallace, Rice

440-yard run
1. James LuValle, UCLA - 47.7 seconds
2. John McCarthy, USC
3. Glenn Hardin, LSU

880-yard run 
1. Elroy Robinson, Fresno State - 1:52.9
2. Ross Bush, USC
3. Jack Fleming, Northwestern

Mile run 
1. Archie San Romani, Emporia State - 4:19.1
2. Harry Williamson, North Carolina
3. Claude Moore, Purdue

Two-mile run 
1. Floyd Lockner, Oklahoma - 9:26.8
2. Tom Ottey, Michigan State
3. William Zepp, Eastern Michigan

Field events

Broad jump 
1. Jesse Owens, Ohio State - 26 feet,  inches
2. Al Olson, USC
3. Moncure Little, William & Mary

High jump 
1. Linn Philson, Drake - 6 feet,  inches
2. Vincent Murphy, Notre Dame
2. Knewell Rushforth, Utah
2. Willis Ward, Michigan

Pole vault 
1. Earle Meadows, USC - 14 feet,  inches
1. Bill Sefton, USC
3. Jack Mauger, California
3. Jack Rand, San Diego State

Discus throw 
1. Kenneth Carpenter, USC - 157 feet,  inches
2. Claude Walton, Colorado
3. Dwight Scheyer, Washington State

Javelin 
1. Charlie Gongloff, Pitt - 221 feet,  inches
2. John Mottram, Stanford
3. Clarence Rowland, Fresno State

Shot put 
1. Elwyn Dees, Kansas - 51 feet,  inches
2. Don Elser, Notre Dame
3. George Theodoratus, Washington State

Hammer throw
1. Anton Kishon, Bates - 168 feet,  inches
2. Chester Cruikshank, Colorado State
3. George Frame, Maine

See also
 NCAA Men's Outdoor Track and Field Championship

References

NCAA Men's Outdoor Track and Field Championship